Cooolbox is a Bulgarian telecommunications company. It was launched in 1997 as ITD Network. The Cooolbox network is entirely built on the FTTH - AON technology and provides internet in Sofia, Plovdiv and Veliko Tarnovo.

History
ITD Network (now Cooolbox) has been in the Internet and telecommunication services market since 1997. At this stage, ITD Network mainly provides leased line access services to smaller ISPs and relatively few business customers in the city of Plovdiv, Bulgaria.

In 1999 they expanded their presence with an office in Sofia.

Since the middle of 2002, ITD Network has offered VoIP telephony.

In 2006, with the introduction of the relevant regulatory framework, ITD Network acquires licenses 116A and 116B and VOIP telephony is transformed into a fixed voice service with the corresponding numbering plan.

Since the beginning of 2008 ITD Network has begun the construction of an optical network in Plovdiv and Veliko Tarnovo to provide internet and telephony to users by using Fiber to the Home Direct Fiber (FTTH - Direct Fiber), or AON. FTTH technology is being used in Bulgaria for the first time by ITD Network to provide mass service to customers. 

In 2008, the company started building its own network in the cities of Plovdiv and Veliko Tarnovo, which started the provision of the Cooolbox service, consisting of: Internet delivery, digital TV and telephony.

The Cooolbox network is entirely built on the FTTH - AON technology and is the only one of its kind in Bulgaria. The same technology is used by the Google Internet to build its network in various US cities. 

In 2011, ITD Network completed the acquisition of Sofia Online, which ensures a strong presence in Sofia as infrastructure and customer base.

In 2016, the company changed its name to Cooolbox, with which it ends the process of transformation from an ISP to an end-to-end Internet provider. At the same time, offering a full gigabit service has begun.

In January 2022 the company added to its portfolio interactive TV with coool.tv online application compatible with smart TVs with Android TV/Google TV, Apple TV, Amazon Fire OS, Samsung (models after 2020) and LG (models after 2018).

Awards
Awards of b2b Media
Third place Most creative workspace for 2016
Second place in Business project of the year 2016  
Second place on Business project of the year 2017

References

Telecommunications companies of Bulgaria